Louis Jules César "Louis-Jules" Bouchot (12 August 1817 – 15 August 1907) was a 19th-century French architect responsible in particular for the construction of the Nice and Milan railway stations.

Biography 
Louis-Jules Bouchot was born 12 août 1817 at No 47 rue de Seine in Paris, from Félix Bouchot, an employee of the General Post Office administration, and Adélaïde Louise Étienne.

A student of the 1834 class, he studied at the École nationale supérieure des Beaux-Arts in Paris where he was a pupil of his uncle, Alphonse de Gisors.

He alternated work with institutional commissions and private orders.

Chief architect of the Compagnie des chemins de fer de Paris à Lyon et à la Méditerranée (PLM) before becoming the official architect of the French government, he was one of the recipients of the rare album of the PLM railway commissioned in 1859 by James de Rothschild to photographer Édouard Baldus.

Bouchot died 15 August 1907 at his home No 6 rue de l'université in Paris. His funeral was held in the French capital, followed by a religious ceremony at église Saint-Thomas-d'Aquin then the burial at Montparnasse Cemetery.

Realisations 
 Palais de justice de Tarbes (1850)
 Château Talabot (Bastide du Roucas-Blanc) Marseille for Paulin Talabot (1860)
 Hôtel des Docks à Marseille (1863). Classified as a Monument historique.
 The old Milan Central railway station (1864), (demolished after 1931)
 Gare de Valence-Ville
 Gare d'Avignon-Centre (1866)
 Gare de Nice-Ville (PLM) (1865–1867)
 Gare de Toulon (Reconstruction after the fire that destroyed the station of architect Laroze)
 Ministère de la Défense at 231 boulevard Saint-Germain in Paris. (1866-1883)

Distinctions 
Bouchot was made a chevalier in the Ordre national de la Légion d'honneur 12 August 1860 and was promoted an officer on 5 February 1878.

Bust of Louis-Jules Bouchot 
A bust of Louis-Jules Bouchot was cast by Gustave Adolphe Désiré Crauk. The  preserves a plaster copy and the Musée d'Orsay a bronze that belonged to the sculptor's widow before its acquisition in 1928.

References

Bibliography 
 Jean-Claude Daufresne, 7. Louis-Jules Bouchot (1817-1907) : à l'Odéon de 1854 à 1897, in Théâtre de l'Odéon: architecture, décors, musée, Éditions Mardaga, 2004 , (pp. 78–90)
 François Pourpardin, Les bâtiments voyageurs édifiés le long de la ligne impériale (La Compagnie du PLM : les gares de l'architecte Jules Bouchot), in Revue d’histoire des chemins de fer, No 38, 2008, (pp. 59–71).

External links 
 60 millions pour une verrue à la gare SNCF on Le Monde (13 April 2012)
 Louis-Jules Bouchot on Prosopo
 Site Srtucturae : Louis-Jules Bouchot on structurae
 BOUCHOT Louis Jules César on prosopo.php
 Louis-Jules Bouchot on Pininterest

19th-century French architects
École des Beaux-Arts alumni
Officiers of the Légion d'honneur
1817 births
Architects from Paris
1907 deaths
Burials at Montparnasse Cemetery